Paul Biddle is an English fine art photographer, who specialises in creating carefully studied surreal artworks using real objects and studio lighting for artistic effects. He has exhibited widely both in Britain and around the world. He has won at least 15 international photography prizes.

Biddle describes his inspirations and influences as ranging "from Renaissance art to Dadaism and Surrealism, from Picasso to the flotsam and jetsam that I pick up on my walks by the sea near my home".

Awards
 The Association of Photographers: 1 Gold, 2 Merits.
 The Royal Photographic Society: 2 Golds.
 Kodak Triple Exposure: Winner.
 3D Illustrators (USA): I Gold, 6 Bronzes.
 Hasselblad Austrian Super Circuit: 1996 Overall Winner (27,000 entries - 101 countries).
 Polaroid European Final Awards.

Exhibitions

UK
 The Association of Photographers
 Tapestry
 The Image Bank (Getty Images)
 Euro RSCG
 Lowe Lintas
 The Royal Photographic Society

Worldwide
 New York City
 Fort Lauderdale
 Tokyo
 Cologne
 Vienna
 Linz
 Arles
 Amsterdam
 The Leonardo da Vinci Museum (Milan)
 Musée de la Civilisation (Quebec)

Permanent Collections
 The Royal Photographic Society (London)

References
 British Journal of Photography Annual 1990.

External links
 Luminous-Lint (art gallery), The Strange Worlds of Paul Biddle (August 2011) Luminous Lint
 Paul Biddle, photographer: Blog Blogspot
 Zone Zero (fine art website), Paul Biddle Zone Zero
 Feature Shoot. Paul Biddle's surreal still life photography. By Dawn Shuck. 21 September 2001. Feature Shoot
 YouTube collage of Paul Biddle's work, set to music YouTube

Year of birth missing (living people)
Living people
English photographers